Shane Todd (born 9 June 1988) is a comedian, television,  and radio presenter and actor from Holywood, Northern Ireland.

Career
Todd began comedy by posting videos on YouTube, as part of the Harlem Gun Club. He also released a teaser for a sitcom called Application, where he plays a fictional version of himself. Until late 2019, Todd appeared on the 'Boytown Podcast' with fellow comedian Dave Elliott, acting as Dave's sidekick. He also hosts his own podcast called 'Tea With Me'.

Personal life
Todd is the son of Denis Todd and Susan Knight. He has two siblings. Todd married his girlfriend, Stacey, in 2018.

Todd is a supporter of Manchester United F.C.

Filmography

Film and Television

Radio

Live Comedy

References

People from Holywood, County Down
1988 births
Living people
Comedians from Northern Ireland
Male actors from Northern Ireland
Radio personalities from Northern Ireland